The Magic of Boney M. is a greatest hits album of recordings by Boney M. released by Sony BMG in October 2006.

The compilation which is an updated version of 1993's Gold – 20 Super Hits and 2001's The Greatest Hits includes eighteen of Boney M's best known hits from the 1970s and 1980s, a new remix of 1976 single "Sunny" by German DJ and record producer Mousse T. as well as one new track featuring vocals from original Boney M. lead vocalist Liz Mitchell.

While this compilation is digitally remastered it contains both original recordings and overdubbed or remixed versions dating from Gold - 20 Super Hits.

The compilation was reissued on 18 March 2022 with new artwork as a special "remix edition". This release replaces "A Moment of Love" with the 2021 remixes of "Rasputin" and "Daddy Cool", along with a previously-unreleased Spanish version of "Rivers of Babylon" entitled "Rios de Babylonia".

Track listing 

 Track 20 is a new recording with featured vocalist Liz Mitchell. The lead male vocalist is unknown.
 The UK release features a slightly realigned track list, however the content is the same.
 The Australian release replaces "Kalimba de Luna" with the 1986 remix of "Feliz Navidad", originally released on The 20 Greatest Christmas Songs.

"Rios de Babylonia" is a newly-recorded Spanish version of "Rivers of Babylon", featuring vocals from Marcia Barrett, Yulee B. and Frank Farian.

Personnel
 Liz Mitchell – lead vocals, backing vocals
 Marcia Barrett – lead vocals, backing vocals
 Frank Farian – lead vocals, backing vocals
 Reggie Tsiboe – lead vocals, backing vocals (tracks 11 & 12)
 Bobby Farrell – vocals (track 12)
 Yulee B – vocals "Rios de Babylonia"

Production 
 Frank Farian – producer
 Mousse T. – remixer

Single release
 "Sunny" (Mousse T. Remix) digital download (Sony BMG)
 "Sunny" (Mousse T. Radio Mix) – 3:21
 "Sunny" (Mousse T. Sexy Disco Radio Mix) – 3:27
 "Sunny" (Mousse T. Extended Radio Mix) – 4:17
 "Sunny" (Mousse T. Sexy Disco Club Mix) – 5:48

Charts

Certifications

References

External links
 [ Allmusic, biography, discography etc.]

Albums produced by Frank Farian
2006 greatest hits albums
Disco compilation albums
Boney M. compilation albums
Sony BMG compilation albums